Berns Salonger is a restaurant and entertainment venue, in Berzelii Park, in central Stockholm, Sweden. The building was constructed from 1862 to 1863 by the architect Johan Fredrik Åbom forpastry chef Heinrech Robert Berns and extended in 1886. Berns often holds concerts and other shows and has a capacity of 1,200.

Berns is the setting for the Strindberg novel The Red Room.

References

External links

Buildings and structures completed in 1863
1863 establishments in Sweden
Culture in Stockholm
Listed buildings in Stockholm
Restaurants in Stockholm